Jorge Paul Gatica Villegas (born June 17, 1996) is a Chilean footballer who currently plays as midfielder for club Santiago Wanderers.

Career
After three seasons with Coquimbo Unido, also winning the 2021 Primera B de Chile, he joined Santiago Wanderers for the 2023 season-

Career statistics

Club

Notes

Honours
Coquimbo Unido
 Primera B (1): 2021

References

External links
 
 
 Jorge Gatica at playmakerstats.com (English version of ceroacero.es)

Living people
1996 births
Footballers from Santiago
Chilean footballers
Santiago Morning footballers
Coquimbo Unido footballers
Santiago Wanderers footballers
Association football midfielders
Primera B de Chile players
Chilean Primera División players